Count Ferdinand Edzard of East Frisia (12 July 1636, Aurich – 1 January 1668, Norden) was known as the "Count of Norden".

Life 
Ferdinand Edzard was a member of the Cirksena ruling house of East Frisia.  He was the youngest son of Count Ulrich II of East Frisia and Landgravine Juliana of Hesse-Darmstadt.  From the age of 14, he attended the academies of Breda and Tübingen.  As part of his training, he undertook extensive travels to France, Switzerland, Italy and England.  In 1658, he returned to the court of his brother Prince Enno Louis at Aurich.  After Enno Louis's sudden death in March 1660, Ferdinand Edzard demanded that power be shared between himself and his brother George Christian.  He could not prevail.  His request to have his share of the inheritance paid out, did not succeed either.  On 18 January 1661 the brothers came to an agreement.  Ferdinand Edzard dropped his request for a share of power in return for an annual sum of money and an apanage consisting the town of Norden. Ferdinand Edzard took up residence in Norden with a small court, and was henceforth known as the "Count of Norden".

On 22 July 1665 he married Anna Dorothea of Criechingen and Püttingen, with whom he had two sons.

The sudden death of George Christian beginning in June 1665 revived the question of government power.  Because George Christian's widow Christine Charlotte of Württemberg was pregnant, Ferdinand Edzard took up the interim government until the birth of the future prince Christian Everhard.  Ferdinand Edzard and Christine Charlotte then jointly took responsibility for the regency and guardianship of the newborn Prince.

References and sources 
 Wiarda, Tieleman Dothias: Ostfriesische Geschichte, vol. 5, Aurich, 1795
 Esselborn, Ernst: Das Geschlecht Cirksena, die Häuptlinge, Grafen und Fürsten von Ostfriesland, Berlin-Pankow, 1945

1636 births
1668 deaths
17th-century German people
Counts of East Frisia